Streptomyces sediminis is a bacterium species from the genus of Streptomyces which has been isolated from sediments of a crater lake from Anatolia in Turkey.

See also 
 List of Streptomyces species

References 

sediminis
Bacteria described in 2018